Lotus may refer to:

Plants
Lotus (plant), various botanical taxa commonly known as lotus, particularly:
Lotus (genus), a genus of terrestrial plants in the family Fabaceae
Lotus flower, a symbolically important aquatic Asian plant also known as Indian or sacred lotus
 Lotus tree, a plant in Greek and Roman mythology

Places
Lotus, California, an unincorporated community in El Dorado County, California, United States
Lotus, Indiana, an unincorporated community in Union County, Indiana, United States
Lotus, Florida, a former village in Brevard County, Florida, United States
Lotus, Kentucky, an unincorporated community in Bullitt County, Kentucky, United States

Brands

Lotus Cars, a British motor vehicle manufacturer
Lotus F1 Team, a British Formula One team that started competing in the 2012 season
Team Lotus, a British Formula One racing team that competed between 1954 and 1994
Pacific Team Lotus, the successor team that resulted from a merger with Pacific and competed in Formula One in 1995
Lotus GP, a French GP2 and GP3 racing team sponsored by Lotus Cars
Team Lotus (2010–11), a Malaysian Formula One racing team that began racing in 2010 as Lotus Racing and became the Caterham F1 Team at the end of the 2011 season
Lotus, a brand of watches, part of the Festina Group
Lotus Foods, an organic rice company
Lotus Bakeries, a Belgian bakery founded in 1932
Lotus Software, a personal computer software company, best known for:
 Lotus Notes, collaborative software, personal information manager and e-mail client now known as IBM Notes
 Lotus 1-2-3 spreadsheet application
Lotus Supercenter, an Asian supermarket chain owned by the Charoen Pokphand Group
Tesco Lotus, a hypermarket chain in Thailand, formerly owned by Lotus Supercenter

Religion
Sacred lotus in religious art
Lotus throne base for figures in Asian religious art
 Lotus, one of the Ashtamangala (Eight Auspicious Symbols)
Lotus Sutra, an influential Mahayana sutra

Media and entertainment

Music
Lotus (guitar), an instrument manufacturer
Lotus (American band), an instrumental rock band
Lotus (Hong Kong band), a 1960s pop band

Albums
Lotus (Christina Aguilera album) (2012), by Christina Aguilera
Lotus (Elisa album) (2003), by Elisa
Lotus (Santana album) (1974), by Santana
Lotus (2009), by Haywyre

Songs
"Lotus" (Arashi song), by Arashi
"Lotus" (Dir En Grey song), a song by Dir En Grey
"Lotus" (R.E.M. song), by R.E.M.
"Lotus", a song from Cage The Elephant's debut album
”Lotus”, a song by Lil Uzi Vert on the album Lil Uzi Vert vs. the World 2 
"Lotus", a song by Minus the Bear on Planet of Ice
"Lotus", a song by Susumu Hirasawa on the 1995 album Sim City

Other media
Lotus (board game), a strategy game
Lotus (magazine), a trilingual political and cultural magazine
Lotus (video game series), a videogame series based on Lotus cars
Lotus, the codename of a character in the 2009 video game Nine Hours, Nine Persons, Nine Doors

Vessels
Lotus (1826 ship), English ship
Lotus (motor vessel), a houseboat yacht
S.S. Lotus, a French steamship involved in the Lotus case criminal trial
S.S.S. Lotus, an American sailing vessel

Other uses
Law of the unconscious statistician, a statistics theorem used to calculate the expected value of a function
Lateral olfactory tract usher substance, a protein in nerve cells promoting axon growth

See also
Lotus-eaters, a Greek mythological people
Lotus position, a posture used in yoga, meditation & Zen Buddhism
Lotus Temple, Baha'i House of Worship in Delhi, India
The Blue Lotus, a Tintin book by Hergé
The White Lotus, an HBO satire comedy miniseries

 Lotos (disambiguation)